The 1968 Ebino earthquake is an earthquake that occurred on February 21, 1968, near the border between Miyazaki, Kumamoto and Kagoshima Prefectures in Japan. Moment magnitude was 6.2.  The earthquake left three people dead and 42 people injured.

See also 
List of earthquakes in 1968
List of earthquakes in Japan

References

External links 

 
 

Earthquakes of the Showa period
Ebino earthquake
Ebino earthquake
Ebino earthquake